WSFX (89.1 FM, "The Cutting Edge") is a radio station broadcasting an alternative music format. Licensed to Nanticoke, Pennsylvania, United States, the station is owned by Luzerne County Community College.

References

External links
 
 

SFX
SFX
Modern rock radio stations in the United States
Luzerne County, Pennsylvania
Radio stations established in 1985
1985 establishments in Pennsylvania